Sevenoaks is a constituency represented in the House of Commons of the UK Parliament since 2019 by Laura Trott, a Conservative.

History
This constituency has existed since the Redistribution of Seats Act 1885.

With the exception of the one-year Parliament in 1923, the constituency has to date been a Conservative stronghold.

1885–1950
Sir Thomas Jewell Bennett before entering Parliament was a leader writer at The Standard and lived in India for many years, working at the Bombay Gazette before becoming both editor and principal proprietor of the Times of India.  Bennett returned to England in 1901 and in 1910 unsuccessfully contested his first Parliamentary election, losing to Alfred Gelder at the time of David Lloyd George and H. H. Asquith's celebrated "People's Budget".  He represented the seat for five years from 1918.

Higher in government in this period was Hilton Young, the Health Secretary between 1931 and 1935. The health portfolio at the time included responsibility for housing, including slum clearance and rehousing. Key items of legislation to which he contributed in this period were:  the Town and Country Planning Act (1932) (which applied to all 'developable' land), the Housing Act (1935) (which laid down standards of accommodation) and the Restriction of Ribbon Development Act (1935) (which sought to consolidate urban development and restrict ribbon sprawl along major highways).

1950–date
Since 1950 the highest government position has been that of Michael Fallon, who was the Secretary of State for Defence from 2014 until resigning on 1 November 2017, in the light of allegations of inappropriate behaviour of a sexual nature.

Boundaries

1918–1950: The Urban Districts of Sevenoaks and Wrotham, and the Rural Districts of Malling and Sevenoaks.

1950–1974: The Urban District of Sevenoaks, and the Rural Districts of Malling and Sevenoaks.

1974–1983: The Urban District of Sevenoaks, the Rural District of Sevenoaks as altered by the Greater London Kent and Surrey Order 1968, and in the Rural District of Dartford the civil parishes of Ash-cum-Ridley, Eynsford, Farningham, Fawkham, Hartley, Horton Kirby, Longfield, Swanley, and West Kingsdown.

1983–1997: The District of Sevenoaks wards of Brasted, Chevening, Crockenhill and Lullingstone, Dunton Green, Eynsford, Farningham, Halstead Knockholt and Badgers Mount, Hextable and Swanley Village, Kemsing, Leigh, Otford, Penshurst and Fordcombe, Riverhead, Seal, Sevenoaks Kippington, Sevenoaks Northern, Sevenoaks Town and St John's, Sevenoaks Weald and Underriver, Sevenoaks Wildernesse, Shoreham, Somerdon, Sundridge and Ide Hill, Swanley Christchurch, Swanley St Mary's, Swanley White Oak, Westerham and Crockham, and West Kingsdown.

1997–2010: The District of Sevenoaks wards of Ash-cum-Ridley, Brasted, Chevening, Crockenhill and Lullingstone, Dunton Green, Eynsford, Farningham, Halstead Knockholt and Badgers Mount, Hextable and Swanley Village, Kemsing, Otford, Riverhead, Seal, Sevenoaks Kippington, Sevenoaks Northern, Sevenoaks Town and St John's, Sevenoaks Weald and Underriver, Sevenoaks Wildernesse, Shoreham, Sundridge and Ide Hill, Swanley Christchurch, Swanley St Mary's, Swanley White Oak, Westerham and Crockham, and West Kingsdown.

2010–present: The District of Sevenoaks wards of Ash, Brasted, Chevening and Sundridge, Crockenhill and Well Hill, Dunton Green and Riverhead, Eynsford, Farningham, Horton Kirby and South Darenth, Fawkham and West Kingsdown, Halstead, Knockholt and Badgers Mount, Hextable, Kemsing, Otford and Shoreham, Seal and Weald, Sevenoaks Eastern, Sevenoaks Kippington, Sevenoaks Northern, Sevenoaks Town and St John's, Swanley Christchurch and Swanley Village, Swanley St Mary's, Swanley White Oak, and Westerham and Crockham Hill.

Constituency profile
The seat is in mainstay London Commuter Belt territory, which supports a relatively high-income local economy with retail and self-employed trades principally benefiting. Sevenoaks constituency covers the towns of Sevenoaks and Swanley in Kent and some of the surrounding area. Most wards are represented by the Conservatives. One Labour councillor represents Swanley St. Mary's ward and both Sevenoaks Eastern councillors are Liberal Democrats, as is one of the two Sevenoaks Northern councillors. There are also four independent councillors.

In statistics
The constituency consists of Census Output Areas of one local government districts with a working population whose income is higher than the national average and lower than average reliance upon social housing. At the end of 2012 the unemployment rate in the constituency stood as 1.7% of the population claiming jobseekers allowance, compared to the regional average of 2.4%. The borough contributing to the bulk of the seat has a low 13.1% of its population without a car, 19.2% of the population without qualifications and a high 32.0% with level 4 qualifications or above.  In terms of tenure 72.7% of homes are owned outright or on a mortgage by occupants as at the 2011 census across the district.

Members of Parliament

Elections

Elections in the 2010s

Elections in the 2000s

Elections in the 1990s

Elections in the 1980s

Elections in the 1970s

Elections in the 1960s

Elections in the 1950s

Elections in the 1940s

Elections in the 1930s

Elections in the 1920s

Elections in the 1910s

Election results 1885–1918

Elections in the 1880s

Elections in the 1890s

Elections in the 1900s

Elections in the 1910s 

General Election 1914–15:

Another General Election was required to take place before the end of 1915. The political parties had been making preparations for an election to take place and by July 1914, the following candidates had been selected; 
Unionist: Henry Forster
Liberal: Leonard Powell

See also
List of parliamentary constituencies in Kent

References
Specific

General
Craig, F. W. S. (1983). British parliamentary election results 1918–1949 (3 ed.). Chichester: Parliamentary Research Services. .

Sevenoaks
Parliamentary constituencies in Kent
Constituencies of the Parliament of the United Kingdom established in 1885